The 2014–15 CEV Women's Challenge Cup was the 35th edition of the European Challenge Cup volleyball club tournament, the former "CEV Cup".

Format
The tournament was played on a knockout format, originally a total of 51 teams were to participate, due to withdraws a total of 49 teams participated. Initially 35 teams were allocated vacancies to enter the competition at the 'Qualification phase', with another 14 teams (after 2 teams withdraw) joining from the Women's CEV Cup entering the competition at the 'Main phase' stage (as per 'Round composition' below).

On 12 June 2014, a drawing of lots in Luxembourg City, Luxembourg, determined the team's pairing for each match. Each team played a home and an away match with result points awarded for each leg (3 points for 3–0 or 3–1 wins, 2 points for 3–2 win, 1 point for 2–3 loss). After two legs, the team with the most result points advanced to the next round. The Golden Set winner is the team that first obtains 15 points, provided that the points difference between the two teams is at least 2 points (thus, the Golden Set is similar to a tiebreak set in a normal match).

Round composition
 1st Round: 6 teams
 2nd Round: 1st Round winners (3 teams) + 29 teams
 16th Final: 2nd Round winners (16 teams) + 14 teams from CEV Cup
 8th Final onwards: winners

Participating teams
A total of 49 teams participated, 35 were allocated direct places and 14 joined from the Women's CEV Cup entering at the 'Main phase'. 

1.Team qualified via CEV Cup entering the 16th Final.

Qualification phase

1st round
1st leg (Team #1 home) 25–26 October 2014
2nd leg (Team #2 home) 1–2 November 2014

2nd round
1st leg (Team #1 home) 11–13 November 2014
2nd leg (Team #2 home) 25–27 November 2014

Main phase
In this stage of the competition, the sixteen qualified teams of the Qualification phase were joined by the losing teams from the 2014–15 Women's CEV Cup. From the 16 teams expected to join from the CEV Cup, 14 teams entered the competition, after the withdraw of 2 teams. That meant two teams received a 16th Final bye.

16th Final
1st leg (Team #1 home) 9–11 December 2014
2nd leg (Team #2 home) 16–18 December 2014

8th Final
1st leg (Team #1 home) 13–15 January 2015
2nd leg (Team #2 home) 20–22 January 2015

4th Final
1st leg (Team #1 home) 3–5 March 2015
2nd leg (Team #2 home) 10–12 March 2015

Final phase

Semi-finals
1st leg (Team #1 home) 25 March 2015
2nd leg (Team #2 home) 29 March 2015

Finals
1st leg (Team #1 home) 8 April 2015
2nd leg (Team #2 home) 12 April 2015

Awards

References

External links
CEV Women's Challenge Cup 14-15 

CEV Women's Challenge Cup
CEV Women's Challenge Cup
CEV Women's Challenge Cup